Michael Douglas White (born January 25, 1951) is a professor in the School of Criminology and Criminal Justice at Arizona State University, where he is also the associate director of the Center for Violence Prevention and Community Safety and director of the doctoral program in criminology and criminal justice. He is known for his research on the effects of police use of body-worn cameras. He produced a report for the United States Department of Justice summarizing the arguments for and against the use of such cameras.

The report concluded that "there is not enough evidence to offer a definitive recommendation regarding the adoption of body-worn cameras by police." Since then, he has predicted that all police departments with 50 or more officers will have body-worn cameras within two to three years.

References

External links
 Faculty page
 

Living people
American criminologists
Arizona State University faculty
Moravian University alumni
Temple University alumni
1951 births